The Battle of Kahe was fought during the East African Campaign of World War I. It was the last action between German and Entente forces before the German retreat from the Kilimanjaro area. British and South African forces surrounded German positions at Kahe, south of Mount Kilimanjaro. Entente forces inflicted heavy casualties and captured large German artillery pieces while receiving comparably little casualties. German forces retreated from there, further into the interior of the colony.

References

Kahe
Kahe
Kahe
1916 in German East Africa
March 1916 events